Kurash at the 2018 Asian Games was held at the Jakarta Convention Center Assembly Hall, Jakarta, Indonesia, from 28 to 30 August 2018.

Schedule

Medalists

Men

Women

Medal table

Participating nations
A total of 173 athletes from 24 nations competed in kurash at the 2018 Asian Games:

References

External links
Kurash at the 2018 Asian Games
Official Result Book – Kurash

 
2018
2018 Asian Games events